Ulrich Vetsch (15 March 1935 – 14 July 2014) was a Swiss footballer who played on the 1950s and early 1960s as defender.

Vetsch played his youth football by Grasshopper Club Zürich and advanced to their first team who played in the Nationalliga A in 1953. He stayed with GC for three seasons. He then moved for one season to FC Luzern, who at that time played in the Nationalliga B, returning to his club of origin just one season later. Again one season later he moved to Young Fellows Zürich. The Young Fellows suffered relegation at the end of the 1958–59 season and therefore Vetsch moved on again.

Vetsch joined FC Basel's first team for their 1959–60 season under manager Jenő Vincze. After playing in four test matches, Vetsch played his domestic league debut for his new club in the away game on 23 August 1953 against Grenchen. At the end of the season the team ended the league in tenth position and the following season in fifth position.

Between the years 1959 and 1961 Vetsch played a total of 33 games for Basel without scoring a goal. 20 of these games were in the Nationalliga A, two in the Swiss Cup and 11 were friendly games.

After these two seasons with Basel Vetsch retired from his playing career. He played his football at much lower level with local club FC Aesch. There after Vetsch dedicated himself to his job as an engineer at the Gasworks in Basel and to his wife Therese Vetsch-Remund.

References

Sources
 Die ersten 125 Jahre. Publisher: Josef Zindel im Friedrich Reinhardt Verlag, Basel. 
 Verein "Basler Fussballarchiv" Homepage

Grasshopper Club Zürich players
FC Luzern players
SC Young Fellows Juventus players
FC Basel players
Swiss men's footballers
Association football defenders
1935 births
2014 deaths